Barry Peter Burchatt  (born 24 October 1987 in Farnborough, Kent) is a former speedway rider in the United Kingdom who rode for the Newport Wasps in 2007  and for the Workington Comets in 2008 in the Premier League.

Accident
Burchatt almost lost his life in a crash during a grasstrack meeting on 11 May 2008. The crash left him with critical internal injuries and forced his retirement from speedway.

References 

1987 births
Living people
British speedway riders
English motorcycle racers
Newport Wasps riders
Rye House Rockets riders
Workington Comets riders
People from Farnborough, London